Festubert is a commune in the Pas-de-Calais department in the Hauts-de-France region of France. The village was on the Western Front during the First World War and was largely destroyed in the May 1915 Battle of Festubert.

Geography

Population

Places of interest
 The church of Notre-Dame, rebuilt, as was much of the village, after the First World War.
 The Commonwealth War Graves Commission cemeteries.

See also
Communes of the Pas-de-Calais department
Defence of Festubert (November 1914)
Battle of Festubert (May 1915)
Battle of the Lys (1918) (Festubert was on the southern extremity of this battle)

References

External links

 Brown’s Road CWGC cemetery
 The CWGC graveyard in the communal cemetery

Communes of Pas-de-Calais